Palombi is a surname. Notable people with the surname include:

Antonello Palombi (born 1968), Italian operatic tenor
Simone Palombi (born 1996), Italian professional footballer

See also 

 Palombo

surnames